James M. Burd (March 31, 1931 – March 18, 2013) was a Republican member of the Pennsylvania House of Representatives.

References

Republican Party members of the Pennsylvania House of Representatives
2013 deaths
1931 births